Panticosa (in Aragonese: Pandicosa) is a municipality located in the province of Huesca, Aragon, Spain.

During the late 19th century and early 20th century, it was a successful spa town, famous for its pure mountain waters, that supposedly cured from liver diseases to herpes. Its Belle Époque spa buildings are well kept and still in use.

References

Municipalities in the Province of Huesca